Adolf Schneeberger (born in Choceň, 1897 - Prague, 1977) was a Czech photographer.

He studied engineering and photography at the Czech Technical University in Prague, 1914. He was the founder of the Czech Photographic Society with Jaromir Funke and Josef Sudek in 1924.

Selected Public Collections
Museum of Contemporary Photography, Columbia College, Chicago, Illinois, USA
National Gallery of Art, Washington, DC, USA

Books of Adolf Schneeberger's works
Dufek, Antonín: Adolf Schneeberge  Prague: Odeon, 1983.
Josef, Váša:  Fotografická tvorba Adolfa Schneebergera  FAMU Praha, 1978
Adlerová Alena, Alborch Carmen, Bydžovská Lenka, Dufek Antonín, Frampton Kenneth, Kubová Alena, Lahoda Vojtěch:    The Art of the Avant-garde in Czechoslovakia 1918 - 1938   Institut Valencia d´Art Modern, 1993 
Birgus, Vladimír: Czech Photographic Avant-Garde, 1918–1948, Publisher:	Cambridge, Mass. : MIT Press, 2002

External links
 Adolf Schneeberger: Sbírka fotografií skupiny PPF 

1897 births
1977 deaths
Photographers from Prague
Czech Technical University in Prague alumni